Rabbit Hole is an upcoming American spy thriller television series created by John Requa and Glenn Ficarra for Paramount+.  The series stars Kiefer Sutherland as a private espionage agent framed for murder.  The series is set to premiere on March 26, 2023 and run for eight episodes.

Premise 
John Weir is a corporate spy adept at deception.  A mysterious world-controlling power frames him for murder, and as Weir goes against this power, he finds himself fighting for democracy.

Cast 
 Kiefer Sutherland as John Weir
 Rob Yang as Edward Homm
 Charles Dance as Dr. Ben Wilson
 Meta Golding as Hailey Winton
 Enid Graham as Josephine "Jo" Madi
 Jason Butler Harner as Valence
 Walt Klink as The Intern
 Ishan Davé as Hafiz
 Wendy Makkena as Debra
 Mark Winnick as Young Crowley

Episodes

Production 
Paramount+ first ordered an espionage drama series created by John Requa and Glenn Ficarra and starring Kiefer Sutherland from CBS Studios in May 2021, and the series title Rabbit Hole was announced in February 2022. Rob Yang was the first co-star added to the cast, followed by Charles Dance, Meta Golding, Enid Graham, Jason Butler Harner, and Walt Klink. Wendy Makkena joined the cast as well in September 2022.

The series began filming in Ontario in May 2022 taking place primarily in Toronto with additional scenes in Hamilton.

On March 13, 2023, Paramount Plus announced via a press release that the second episode would be titled "At Any Given Moment", and the third episode would be titled "The Algorithms Of Control", alongside promotional images from each episode.

Release 
On January 9, 2023, at Paramount+’s Television Critics Association panel, the series was revealed to be premiering on March 26, 2023.

References

External links 
 Official site on Paramount+
 

2020s American drama television series

American spy thriller television series
English-language television shows
Paramount+ original programming
Television shows filmed in Toronto
Television shows filmed in Hamilton, Ontario
Television series by CBS Studios
Upcoming television series